Ben En National Park (Vietnamese: Vườn quốc gia Bến En) is a national park in Thanh Hóa Province, Vietnam. The national park was founded by the decision 33 dated 27 January 1992 of the Chairman of the Council of Ministers of Vietnam.

Location
The national park is situated in districts of Như Thanh and Như Xuân, Thanh Hóa Province. The coordinates: 19°31′ to 19°43′ N and 105°25′ to 105°38′ E.

There are mounts, hills, streams, rivers in the park area. The park features a  lake with 21 islets.

Biodiversity
Studies found that there are several rare species in this park. So far recovered were 1,389 species of plants, 1,004 species of animals, 66 species of mammals, 201 species of birds, 54 species of reptiles, 31 species of amphibians, 68 species of fish and 499 species of insects. There are 462 varieties of flora in the park, and 125 orders. Probably some of the reported species are now extinct.

 In Ben En National Park the endangered tree species Erythrophleum fordii still can be found. In 2011 Vietnamese and Singaporean scientists discovered the new ginger species Distichochlamys benenica.

Tourism
The national park's main attraction is Lake Song Muc which can be explored by motor boat or kayak. Further tourist attractions are a caves situated in the South and the North of the national park. There are two forest trails, one starting next to the guesthouse of the national park, the other is situated on one of the islands. This island has two holiday homes which are for rent. The guesthouse next to the dam offers basic accommodation.

Ethnic groups
Different ethnic groups including the Thai, Tho and Muong live within the national park.

References

External links
Official website of Ben En National Park
Vườn quốc gia Bến En on Thanh Hoa Tourist Site
Vietnam National Parks & Reserves

National parks of Vietnam
Geography of Thanh Hóa province
Protected areas established in 1992
Tourist attractions in Thanh Hóa province